was a district located in Kumamoto Prefecture, Japan.

Former towns and villages
 Akita
 Kawachi
 Tenmei
 Hokubu

Merger
On February 1, 1991 - the towns of Akita, Hokubu, Kawachi and Tenmei were merged into the expanded city of Kumamoto. Hōtaku District was dissolved as a result of this merger.

Former districts of Kumamoto Prefecture